Left Hand Pathology is a debut full-length album by Swedish goregrind/death metal band General Surgery after seventeen years forming. The title is a reference to the Entombed's album Left Hand Path. The cover illustrations was taken from "De humani corporis fabrica" by Andreas Vesalius (Brussels, 1514-1564).

Track listing

Personnel
General Surgery
Andreas Mitroulis - Drums, Backing Vocals
Joacim Carlsson - Guitars
Glenn Sykes - Bass, Backing Vocals
Grant McWilliams - Vocals
Johan Wallin - Guitars, Backing Vocals

Guest musician
Matti Kärki - Vocals

Production
Emelie Helldén - Photography
Glenn Sykes - Artwork, Layout, Cover concept
Linus Nirbrant - Engineering, Mixing
Anders Eriksson - Engineering, Mixing
Peter in de Betou - Mastering
K SST - Vinyl Mastering

References

2006 debut albums
General Surgery (band) albums